Coral is a 1915 American silent drama film directed by Henry MacRae and starring Marie Walcamp, Wellington A. Playter and Ruby Cox.

Cast
 Marie Walcamp as Coral
 Wellington A. Playter as Philip Norton 
 Ruby Cox as Helen Norton
 Rex De Rosselli as Dan McQuade
 Mr. Titus as Norton
 Sherman Bainbridge as Paul Dore
 Mrs. Wellington Playter as Janitor's Wife

References

Bibliography
 Robert B. Connelly. The Silents: Silent Feature Films, 1910-36, Volume 40, Issue 2. December Press, 1998.

External links
 

1915 films
1915 drama films
1910s English-language films
American silent feature films
Silent American drama films
American black-and-white films
Universal Pictures films
Films directed by Henry MacRae
1910s American films